Amethyst Bradley "Surprise" Ralani (born 4 October 1987) is a South African soccer player who plays for Mamelodi Sundowns in the Premier Soccer League.

Career
Playing in the  2016 Allsvenskan, Helsingborgs IF signed him until the conclusion of the current season. He made his debut in July 2016.

Ralani returned to South Africa in January 2018, signing for Premier Soccer League club Cape Town City.

References

External links

1987 births
Living people
People from Kimberley, Northern Cape
South African soccer players
Association football midfielders
Helsingborgs IF players
IFK Hässleholm players
Landskrona BoIS players
Lyngby Boldklub players
Cape Town City F.C. (2016) players
Mamelodi Sundowns F.C. players
Allsvenskan players
Superettan players
Danish 1st Division players
South African Premier Division players
South African expatriate soccer players
South African expatriate sportspeople in Sweden
South African expatriate sportspeople in Denmark
Expatriate footballers in Sweden
Expatriate men's footballers in Denmark